Stung is a 1931 two reel sound short film, directed by William Cowen.

During a murder trial, a defense attorney "fixes" a witless juror to hold out for a manslaughter verdict.  The critic for the Motion Picture Herald said, "A surprise in the last spoken words of this short feature is the entire "punch"

Cast
Raymond Hatton
Warner Richmond
Maurice Black
Crauford Kent
Fred Howard
John Hyams

External links

References 

1931 films
American black-and-white films
American short films
Films directed by William J. Cowen